Thompson Peak refers to one of these mountain peaks:

Thompson Peak (Arizona), a McDowell Mountains summit 20 miles from Phoenix with amateur and Maricopa County government radio towers accessible via a service road from Fountain Hills
Thompson Peak (Yavapai County, Arizona)
Thompson Peak (California) - highest summit of the Salmon Mountains
Thompson Peak (El Dorado County, California)
Thompson Peak (Plumas County, California), a northern Sierra Crest summit
Thompson Peak (Tulare County, California)
Thompson Peak (Tuolumne County, California)
Thompson Peak (Bonneville County, Idaho)
Thompson Peak (Idaho) - highest summit of the Sawtooth Mountains
Thompson Peak (Madison County, Montana)
Thompson Peak (Mineral County, Montana), in Mineral County, Montana
Thompson Peak (Sanders County, Montana) - highest summit of the Thompson Peaks (Montana)
Thompson Peak (New Mexico)
Thompson Peak (Oregon)
Thompson Peak (Utah)
Thompson Peak (Antarctica)

References